La Lanterne may refer to:

 La Lanterne (Versailles) a residence of the president of France in Versailles
 La Lanterne (19th-century magazine) a French magazine published in 1868-1869 and 1874-1876, created by Victor Henri Rochefort, Marquis de Rochefort-Luçay

See also 
 À la lanterne, French word and French Revolution slogan
 La Lanterne-et-les-Armonts, French commune